Scanning Habitable Environments with Raman and Luminescence for Organics and Chemicals (SHERLOC) is an ultraviolet Raman spectrometer that uses fine-scale imaging and an ultraviolet (UV) laser to determine fine-scale mineralogy, and detect organic compounds designed for the Perseverance rover as part of the Mars 2020 mission. It was constructed at the Jet Propulsion Laboratory with major subsystems being delivered from Malin Space Science Systems and Los Alamos National Laboratory. The Principal Investigator is Luther Beegle, and the Deputy Principal Investigator is Rohit Bhartia.

SHERLOC has a calibration target with possible Mars suit materials, and it will measure how they change over time in the Martian surface environment.

Goals
According to a 2017 Universities Space Research Association (USRA) report:

Construction
There are three locations on the rover where SHERLOC components are located. The SHERLOC Turret Assembly (STA) is mounted at the end of the rover arm. The STA contains spectroscopy and imaging components. The SHERLOC Body Assembly (SBA) is located on the rover chassis and acts as the interface between the STA and the Mars 2020 rover. The SBA deals with command and data handling, along with power distribution. The SHERLOC Calibration Target (SCT) is located on the front of the rover chassis and hold spectral standards.

SHERLOC consists of both imaging and spectroscopic elements. It has two imaging components consisting of heritage hardware from the MSL MAHLI instrument. One is a built to print re-flight that can generate color images over multiple scales. The other acts as the mechanism that allows the instrument to get a contextual image of a sample and to autofocus the laser spot for the spectroscopic part of the SHERLOC investigation.

For Spectroscopy, it utilizes a NeCu laser to generate UV photons (248.6 nm) which can generate characteristic Raman and fluorescence photons from a scientifically interesting sample. The deep UV laser is co-boresighted to a context imager and integrated into an autofocusing/scanning optical system that allows correlation of spectral signatures to surface textures, morphology and visible features. The context imager has a spatial resolution of 30 µm and currently is designed to operate in the 400-500 nm wavelength range.

One of the cameras is the Wide Angle Topographic Sensor for Operations and eNgineering (WATSON).

See also

 Composition of Mars
 Curiosity rover 
 Exploration of Mars
 Geology of Mars
 List of rocks on Mars
 Mars Science Laboratory
 MOXIE
 PIXL
 Scientific information from the Mars Exploration Rover mission
 Timeline of Mars Science Laboratory

References

External links
 Mars 2020 Mission - Home Page - NASA/JPL

Mars 2020 instruments
Raman spectroscopy
Spectrometers